Real-Time Executive for Multiprocessor Systems (RTEMS), formerly Real-Time Executive for Missile Systems, and then Real-Time Executive for Military Systems, is a real-time operating system (RTOS) designed for embedded systems. It is free and open-source software.

Development began in the late 1980s with early versions available via File Transfer Protocol (ftp) as early as 1993. OAR Corporation is currently managing the RTEMS project in cooperation with a steering committee which includes user representatives.

Design
RTEMS is designed for real-time, embedded systems and to support various open application programming interface (API) standards including Portable Operating System Interface (POSIX) and µITRON. The API now known as the Classic RTEMS API was originally based on the Real-Time Executive Interface Definition (RTEID) specification. RTEMS includes a port of the FreeBSD Internet protocol suite (TCP/IP stack) and support for various file systems including Network File System (NFS) and File Allocation Table (FAT).

RTEMS provides extensive multi-processing and memory-management services, and even a System-database alongside many other facilities. It has extensive documentation.

Architectures
RTEMS has been ported to various target processor architectures:

 ARM
 Atmel AVR
 Blackfin
 Freescale, now NXP ColdFire
 Texas Instruments – C3x/C4x DSPs
 Intel – x86 architecture members 80386, Pentium, and above
 LatticeMico32
 68k
 MIPS
 Nios II
 OpenRISC
 PowerPC
 Renesas – H8/300, M32C, M32R, SuperH
 RISC-V RV32, RV64 using QEMU
 SPARC – ERC32, LEON, V9

Uses
RTEMS is used in many application domains. The Experimental Physics and Industrial Control System (EPICS) community includes multiple people who are active RTEMS submitters. RTEMS is also popular for space uses since it supports multiple microprocessors developed for use in space including SPARC ERC32 and LEON, MIPS Mongoose-V, ColdFire, and PowerPC architectures, which are available in space hardened models. RTEMS is currently orbiting Mars as part of the Electra software radio on NASA's Mars Reconnaissance Orbiter, and the ESA's Trace Gas Orbiter.

License
RTEMS is distributed under a modified GNU General Public License (GPL), allowing linking RTEMS objects with other files without needing the full executable to be covered by the GPL. This license is based on the GNAT Modified General Public License with the language modified to not be specific to the programming language Ada.

See also

Comparison of open-source operating systems
LatticeMico32
Qi hardware

References

External links 

 
  Wiki
 RTEMS Centre

Embedded operating systems
Real-time operating systems
ARM operating systems
MIPS operating systems
Computer-related introductions in 1993